Criminal Justice: Adhura Sach is an Indian Hindi-language legal drama web series directed by Rohan Sippy. Starring Pankaj Tripathi, Shweta Basu Prasad, Purab Kohli and Swastika Mukherjee in prominent roles, the storyline follows the murder case of a teenage celebrity. It premiered on 26 August 2022 and is the third installment in Hotstar Specials' anthology courtroom drama, Criminal Justice.

Synopsis
Mukul Ahuja is a young and spoilt son of Avantika Ahuja & Arvind Ahuja and stepson of Neeraj Ahuja. Neeraj's daughter Zara Ahuja is a child star who appears in a teleseries called Bittu. Ahujas practically live on money earned by Zara. A property developer in Madh Island contracts Zara to shoot an ad film for his upcoming property. A night before the shoot, both Mukul and Zara sneak out of their villa separately and end up in the same party. They have a big fight in public before they leave the party.

Mukul ends up back at home, but Zara does not return. Her body is then found drowned in the sea with acid burns on her face. All circumstantial evidences point to Mukul, who is arrested and placed in Juvenile Justice Home. Public Prosecutor Lekha is appointed to represent State of Maharashtra, who is almost prejudiciously determined to get Mukul convicted. Meanwhile, Zara's parents hire Madhav Mishra (Pankaj Tripathi) as defense counsel, but Mukul does not have confidence in his lawyer and tried his own means to get out of the mess.

Cast
 Pankaj Tripathi as Advocate Madhav Mishra, Mukul's lawyer
 Shweta Basu Prasad as Prosecutor Lekha Agastya
 Purab Kohli as Neeraj Ahuja, Mukul's step-father
 Swastika Mukherjee as Avantika Ahuja, Mukul's mother
 Aaditya Gupta as Mukul Ahuja, Zara's elder step-brother
 Deshna Dugad as Zara Ahuja, Mukul's younger step-sister
 Gaurav Gera as Arvind Ahuja, Mukul's father
 Khushboo Atre as Ratna Mishra, Madhav's wife
 Adinath Kothare as Inspector Prashant Waghmare
 Kalyanee Mulay as Gauri Karmarkar
 Rushad Rana
 Chandresh Singh
 Ishrat Khan
 Rajesh Khera as Solkar, Lekha's senior
 Upendra Limaye
 Aatm Prakash Mishra as Deepu, Madhav's assistant

Episodes

Release
On 10 August 2022, Disney+ Hotstar released the trailer and announced the release date. The series premiered on Disney+ Hotstar on 26 August 2022 and concluded on 7 October 2022.

Reception
The series received mixed reviews from critics. Subhash K. Jha, reviewing on Firstpost, praised the "storytelling structure, giving to each episode a kind of free-flowing momentum that doesn’t seem artificial or simulated" and added that the "new season manages to go beyond the other two seasons in the pursuit of an engaging thriller perched on the legal theme." Agnivo Niyogi of The Telegraph praised the screenplay and acting performances, calling the series "an instant hit". Nandini Ramnath wrote on Scroll.in that Pankaj Tripathi "hugely boosts the new edition, even if he can’t quite rescue it entirely."

Archika Khurana of The Times of India gave the series three stars out of five, calling it an "engaging legal drama with emotionally dragging scenes", which is "overly stretched before the actual action and courtroom drama begins." Srijita Sen of News18 opined that important topics like trial by media, juvenile justice system, substance abuse and mental health issues in adolescents remained underexplored due to "unnecessary, slow-paced drama". Abhimanyu Mathur of Hindustan Times was critical of the storyline for sidetracking from the show's original theme of portraying "the shortcomings of India’s legal systems" and labelled it a "run-of-the-mill murder mystery".

References

External links 
 

Hindi-language Disney+ Hotstar original programming
2022 Indian television seasons
Indian drama television series
Indian legal television series
Hindi-language television shows
Television shows set in Mumbai
Television series by BBC Studios